Tour-Spiel is an EP by Minutemen, released in 1985. It contains four songs, all covers. A studio version of track 1 appears on Double Nickels on the Dime. Studio versions of "Lost" and "The Red and The Black", with different musical arrangements, appear on 3-Way Tie (For Last).

The songs were recorded in the studio of a Tucson radio station.

Tour-Spiel is included on 1989's Post-Mersh Vol. 3.

Track listing
 "Ain't Talkin' 'Bout Love" (Van Halen)
 "The Red and the Black" (Blue Öyster Cult)
 "Green River" (Creedence Clearwater Revival)
 "Lost" (Meat Puppets)

References

Minutemen (band) albums
1985 EPs
Covers EPs
Reflex Records EPs